Laennecia pimana is an herbaceous species from Mexico. The plant is known only from the type locale, i.e., the village of Nabogame, 18 km northwest of Yepachi, Chihuahua, at an elevation of approximately 1800 m in the Sierra Madre Occidental.

The species is a small, ascending herb with densely tomentose foliage.

References

Astereae
Flora of Mexico
Flora of Chihuahua (state)
Plants described in 1990